The International Trade Committee is one of the Select Committees of the British House of Commons, having been established in 2016. It oversees the operations of the Department for International Trade and its associated public bodies.

Membership
As of February 2023, the members of the committee are as follows:

Changes since 2019

2017-2019
The chair was elected on 12 July 2017, with the members of the committee being announced on 11 September 2017.

Changes 2017-2019

2016-2017
The chair was elected on 19 October 2016, with members being announced on 31 October 2016.

See also
Parliamentary Committees of the United Kingdom

References

External links
Official website
Records for this Committee are held at the Parliamentary Archives

Select Committees of the British House of Commons
2016 establishments in the United Kingdom
Parliamentary committees on International Trade